Craig Millar (born July 12, 1976) is a Canadian former professional ice hockey defenseman who played in the NHL with the Edmonton Oilers, Nashville Predators, and Tampa Bay Lightning.

Born in Winnipeg, Manitoba, Millar was drafted by the Buffalo Sabres in the 9th round, 225th overall in the 1994 NHL Entry Draft while playing for the Swift Current Broncos of the WHL. After being drafted Millar returned to the Broncos and played another 2 seasons with the team, scoring 77 points in 72 games his final season with the team.

For the 1996–97 season Millar turned pro and joined the Rochester Americans, the Sabres minor league affiliate. After 64 games with the Americans, Millar was traded along with Barrie Moore to the Edmonton Oilers for Miroslav Satan. Millar made his NHL Debut with the Oilers that year, appearing in 1 game. The next 2 seasons saw Millar split time between the Oilers and their minor league affiliate Hamilton Bulldogs.

Prior to the 1999–2000 season, Millar was traded to the Nashville Predators for a 3rd round draft pick (which would turn out to be Mike Comrie). That year he enjoyed his best NHL season, appearing in 57 games and scoring 14 points. The following season Millar played part of the year in the minors and 5 games with the Predators before being released. He was picked up by the Tampa Bay Lightning and played 16 games with the team.

For the 2001–02 season Millar played briefly in Germany and Slovakia before retiring in 2002.

Career statistics

Regular season and playoffs

Awards
 1996: WHL East First All-Star Team
 1997: AHL All-Rookie Team

External links
 

1976 births
Living people
Buffalo Sabres draft picks
Detroit Vipers players
Edmonton Oilers players
Grand Rapids Griffins players
Hamilton Bulldogs (AHL) players
HC Slovan Bratislava players
Ice hockey people from Winnipeg
Milwaukee Admirals players
Nashville Predators players
Rochester Americans players
Swift Current Broncos players
Tampa Bay Lightning players
Canadian ice hockey defencemen
Canadian expatriate ice hockey players in the United States
Canadian expatriate ice hockey players in Germany
Canadian expatriate ice hockey players in Slovakia